Back Creek is a stream in eastern St. Francois County, in the U.S. state of Missouri. It is a tributary of Wolf Creek which it joins about four miles southeast of Farmington, Missouri.

Back Creek was named for the fact due to its irregular mouth, the creek backs up during high water.

See also
List of rivers of Missouri

References

Rivers of St. Francois County, Missouri
Rivers of Missouri